Armand Angster (born 20 January 1947) is a French clarinetist. With Françoise Kubler (soprano), he is the founder of the ensemble "Accroche Note", research and creative formation in contemporary music.

Career 
Born in Strasbourg, Angster's mastery of the different clarinets (soprano, bass clarinet and metal doublebass) allows him to be the dedicatee of works by contemporary composers (Brian Ferneyhough, Ansioso quasi con gioia (2015) by Stefano Gervasoni, La mesure des choses I. La mesure de l'air (1992) by Joël-François Durand,) as well as their interpreter (Aleph (1985) by Philippe Manoury, Dikha by Christophe Bertrand, By the Way by Pascal Dusapin, Assonance III (1989) by Michael Jarrell).

In 1981, he created in Strasbourg with Françoise Kubler the Accroche Note ensemble offering programmes combining music from yesterday and today; this ensemble is supported in particular by the Ministry of Culture and the City of Strasbourg.

He is soloist in various formations ranging from the Orchestre philharmonique de Radio France, the Orchestre philharmonique de Strasbourg to ensembles of contemporary music in Europe (Nieuw Ensemble d'Amsterdam.)

He regularly takes part in the Musica Festival of Strasbourg and to numerous others ( at Le Mans in 1989).

Angster teaches clarinet and chamber music at the Conservatoire de Strasbourg and at the Haute École des arts du Rhin in Strasbourg. Many of his students such as Manuel Metzger, and Jean-Francois Charles turned professionals.

He is recognized in the jazz world, notably thanks to the concerts and recordings in 1990 of the clarinet trio with Louis Sclavis and Jacques Di Donato, renowned improvisers and masters of the clarinet.

Awards 
 Angster was made a Chevalier in the Ordre des Arts et des Lettres in 2012.

Selected discography 
Jazz
 Trio de clarinettes live with Jacques Di Donato, Louis Sclavis (FMP, 1991)
 Trio de clarinettes: Ramdam with Sylvain Kassap, Jean-Marc Foltz (Evidence, 2008)
Spectralism
 Inner Time II (live) by Armand Angster "Clarinet System" (Montaigne, 1994)
Chamber music
 Eco, composer Michael Jarrell, with the ensemble Accroche Notes (Accord, 2005)
Contemporary music
La Chute d'Icare (premiere in 1988) for clarinet and ensemble, by Brian Ferneyhough (Etcetera KTC1070, 1988)

References

External links 
 L'invité de l'émission d'Arnaud Merlin: Armand Angster, 23 mai 2016 on France Musique
 Accroche Note
 "Chronique: Le Trio de clarinette" by Sophie Chambon, 28 April 2008
 

1947 births
Living people
Musicians from Strasbourg
French classical clarinetists
French jazz clarinetists
Chevaliers of the Ordre des Arts et des Lettres
21st-century clarinetists